Juntos ("together" in Spanish) may refer to:

 "Juntos (Together)", a 2015 song by Juanes
 "Juntos", a song by DJ Python from Mas Amable
 Juntos, a 2009 film by Nicolás Pereda

See also
 Junto (disambiguation)
 Juntos Otra Vez (disambiguation)
Together (disambiguation)